Jacksonville is a city in Calhoun County, Alabama, United States. As of the 2010 census the population was 12,548, which is a 49% increase since 2000. It is included in the Anniston-Oxford Metropolitan Statistical Area. The city is home to Jacksonville State University, which is a center of commerce and one of the largest employers in the area.

History
Jacksonville was founded in 1833 on land purchased from Creek Indian Chief "Du-Hoag" Ladiga. First called Drayton, the town was renamed to honor President Andrew Jackson in 1834. There are a couple Civil War monuments in town, including a statue of Major John Pelham in the city cemetery and a statue of a Confederate soldier in the middle of the square. Jacksonville served as the county seat for Calhoun County (pronounced Cal'n County) until the 20th century when it moved to Anniston. Jacksonville State University was founded here in 1883.

An EF3 tornado hit Jacksonville on March 19, 2018, causing extensive damage to the city and Jacksonville State University, almost $42 million in damages. The relatively low number of casualties, specifically just four injuries, was attributed by some to the fact that the university was on spring break at the time. More than 1,000 volunteers assisted in the immediate tornado relief. Caleb Howard, then a senior at Jacksonville State University, said that "[i]t's been amazing to see the university and the community come together." Classes resumed at the university the following month. Although the university's usual site for graduation, Pete Mathews Coliseum, was damaged in the tornado along with over 20 other buildings, the first spring graduation since the tornado proceeded as scheduled on May 4 outside the football stadium. Dr. John Beeler, the university's president, said "It's a joyous event generally because you're celebrating the accomplishments of all your graduates, but it's an even more joyous event because to me it's a celebration of how far we've come in a short time in recovering from these tornadoes."

Geography
Nestled in the foothills of the Appalachians, Jacksonville is located at 33°48'56.758" North, 85°45'37.681" West (33.815766, -85.760467).

Jacksonville is located in a valley between Choccolocco Mountain to the east and smaller ridges to the west.

Demographics

2020 census

As of the 2020 United States census, there were 14,385 people, 4,518 households, and 2,472 families residing in the city.

2010 census
As of the census of 2010, there were 12,548 people, 4,917 households, and 2,466 families residing in the city. The racial makeup of the city was 68.7% White, 26.8% Black or African American, 0.5% Native American, 1.3% Asian, 0.2% Pacific Islander, 0.6% from other races, and 1.9% from two or more races. 2.3% of the population were Hispanic or Latino of any race.

There were 4,917 households, out of which 22.1% had children under the age of 18 living with them, 33.5% were married couples living together, marriage 13.0% had a female householder with no husband present, and 49.8% were non-families. 33.2% of all households were made up of individuals, and 8.7% had someone living alone who was 65 years of age or older. The average household size was 2.24 and the average family size was 2.91.

In the city, the age distribution of the population shows 17.2% under the age of 18, 32.6% from 18 to 24, 20.3% from 25 to 44, 18.4% from 45 to 64, and 11.5% who were 65 years of age or older. The median age was 25.1 years. For every 100 females, there were 87.6 males. For every 100 females age 18 and over, there were 89.6 males.

The median income for a household in the city was $33,987, and the median income for a family was $50,863. Males had a median income of $35,615 versus $26,975 for females. The per capita income for the city was $17,063. About 17.6% of families and 28.4% of the population were below the poverty line, including 29.1% of those under age 18 and 11.6% of those age 65 or over.

Transportation
Two Alabama state routes pass through Jacksonville:
State Route 21 (Pelham Road)
State Route 204 (Nisbet Street)

Education
Jacksonville is the home of Jacksonville State University, a public, coeducational university with an enrollment of almost 10,000. It offers degrees in business, communication, education, family sciences, liberal arts and sciences, nursing and technology in addition to continuing education programs. The university's campus is located a few blocks north of the square.

Jacksonville is home to two public schools run by Jacksonville City Schools:
Jacksonville High School (Grades 7-12).
Kitty Stone Elementary School (Grades K-6).
There are also two public schools located northwest of the city proper that serve the unincorporated communities of Pleasant Valley and Williams and are run by Calhoun County Schools:
Pleasant Valley High School
Pleasant Valley Elementary School

There is also a Christian school called Jacksonville Christian Academy (JCA) located within the city.

The Calhoun County Center for the Arts offers classes through the Community Center.

Media
Newspaper
The Jacksonville News - Weekly, locally owned newspaper
The Chanticleer - Student-run newspaper of Jacksonville State University

Magazine
House to House Heart to Heart - Bi-monthly Christian magazine distributed through Churches of Christ; circulation over 2.5 million each issue

Television
WJXS TV 24  - Local news, sports and programming

AM Radio
WCHA Alabama 810 - Local news, sports and Classic Country music

FM Radio
WLJS 91.9 - College radio, limited NPR station

Notable people
Rick Bragg, Alabama writer who won the Pulitzer Prize for Feature Writing in 1996 while working for The New York Times
Glen Browder, U.S. Representative from 1989 to 1997 and professor of political science at Jacksonville State University.
John Henry Caldwell, U.S. Representative from 1873 to 1877.
William Crutchfield, U.S. Representative from 1873 to 1875. Lived in Jacksonville from 1844 to 1850.
Todd Cunningham, Major League Baseball center fielder
John Horace Forney, major general in the Confederate States Army during the American Civil War
William H. Forney, U.S. Representative from 1875 to 1893
Riley Green, country music singer
James A. Haley, U.S. Representative representing Florida from 1953 to 1977.
Thomas C. Hindman, lawyer, United States Representative from the 1st Congressional District of Arkansas, and a major general in the Confederate States Army during the American Civil War.
Harvey Jackson III, notable Alabama historian
Lilly Ledbetter, women's equality activist and plaintiff in the American employment discrimination case Ledbetter v. Goodyear Tire & Rubber Co.
Shed Long, professional baseball player
Darrell Malone, former National Football League cornerback
Herman Clarence Nixon, political scientist, historian, and member of the Nashville-based Southern Agrarians
John Pelham, celebrated Confederate officer
Neel Reid, prominent early-twentieth century architect

References

External links
City of Jacksonville official website
Jacksonville City Schools
Kitty Stone Elementary School
Jacksonville High School
Jacksonville State University

 
Cities in Alabama
Cities in Calhoun County, Alabama
Populated places established in 1833
1833 establishments in Alabama